The Caine Mutiny is a 1959 Australian TV play based on The Caine Mutiny Court Martial broadcast by Melbourne's Channel 7. It was the first commercial TV channel in Australia to present a full-length live drama and was broadcast on January 11, 1959 over two hours. Peter Randall produced and the cast had performed the play for three weeks at the Little Theatre in South Yarra.

It was the first live TV drama in Australia to not come from the ABC studios.

Cast
George Fairfax as Barney Greenwald
Kevin Colebrook as Commander Queeg
Robert Gardiner as Maryak

Reception
The Age called it "a triumph".

References

Australian television plays
1950s Australian television plays
1959 television plays